Andrey Plotnikov (Russian: Андрей Плотников, born 12 August 1967) is a Russian race walker, who won the bronze medal in the 50 km race at the 1998 European Championships. He represented his native country at the 1996 Summer Olympics in Atlanta, Georgia.

International competitions

References

European Championships

1967 births
Living people
Russian male racewalkers
Olympic male racewalkers
Olympic athletes of Russia
Athletes (track and field) at the 1996 Summer Olympics
European Athletics Championships medalists
Russian Athletics Championships winners